Ditter is a surname. Notable people with the surname include:

Christian Ditter (born 1977), German film director, producer and screenwriter
J. William Ditter (1888–1943), American politician
John William Ditter Jr. (1921–2019), American judge
Robert Ditter (1924−2007), German educator